The 15th European Cross Country Championships were held at Brussels in Belgium on 14 December 2008. Serhiy Lebid took his eighth title in the men's competition and Hilda Kibet won the women's race.

Results

Men individual 10.0 km

Total 77 competitors

Men teams

Total 12 teams

Women individual 8.0 km

Total 64 competitors

Women teams

Total 11 teams

Men U23 individual 8.0 km

Total 85 competitors

Men U23 teams

Total 16 teams

Women U23 individual 6.0 km

Tota 66 competitors

Women U23 teams

Total 11 teams

Junior men individual 6.0 km

Total 94 competitors

Junior men teams

Total 16 teams

Junior women individual 4.0 km

Total 81 competitors

Junior women teams

Total 11 teams

References

European Cross Country Championships
European Cross Country Championships
Cross country running in Belgium
2008 in Belgian sport
December 2008 sports events in Europe
2000s in Brussels
Sports competitions in Brussels